Berberis microphylla, common name box-leaved barberry and Magellan barberry, in Spanish calafate and michay and other names, is an evergreen shrub, with simple, shiny box-like leaves. The calafate is native to southern Argentina and Chile and is a symbol of Patagonia.

It has many arching branches, each covered in many tripartite spines. The bush has many small yellow flowers in summer. Its edible blue-black berries are harvested for jams, but are eaten fresh too - a legend tells that anyone who eats a calafate berry will be certain to return to Patagonia.

The calafate is grown commercially for its fruit, potential medical uses and as a garden plant or bonsai. Its wood is used to make a red dye. The cultivar Berberis microphylla 'Nana' is widely available as a garden shrub, and is also used in commercial plantings as a low spiny hedge to discourage intruders, but it does not fruit.

Berberis microphylla should not be confused with Mahonia microphylla, native to China.

References

External links

microphylla
Flora of Argentina
Flora of southern Chile
Crops originating from the Americas
Plants described in 1789